The Conservatoire de musique de Genève is a music school in Geneva, Switzerland.

The Conservatory hosts 2,400 non-professional students. Since 2009, the professional courses have been led by the Geneva University of Music (Haute école de musique de Genève).

History
Its current building, designed by Jean-Baptiste Lesueur, dates from 1858. This conservatory is the oldest music education institution in Switzerland, and one of the oldest conservatories in Europe.

Franz Liszt taught at this conservatory during the first year of its history.

The Geneva International Music Competition was founded in 1939 in the Conservatory, and is its first international competition.

External links
Official website of Geneva University of Music 
Official website of Geneva Conservatory 

Music schools in Switzerland
Cultural venues in Geneva
Schools in Geneva
Educational institutions established in 1835
1835 establishments in Switzerland
Baroque architecture in Switzerland